Dalrymple Heights is a rural locality in the Mackay Region, Queensland, Australia. In the  Dalrymple Heights had a population of 44 people.

Geography 
The ridgeline of the Clarke Range forms the eastern boundary of the locality. Immediately west of this is a relatively flat area which is predominantly used for grazing on native vegetation. Most of the locality further west is mountainous and undeveloped and is within the Eungella National Park.

History 
The first blocks were offered as dairying selections in 1912.

Dalrymple Heights Provisional School was built by local settlers and opened on 14 June 1937. In 1950 it became Dalrymple Heights State School. It closed on 9 September 1959. Opened as a provisional school in 1937 and was proclaimed a state school in 1950. It closed in 1959. It was at 686 Dalrymple Road.

In the  Dalrymple Heights had a population of 44 people.

Economy 
Historically, this was a dairying area. However, de-regulation and supermarket purchasing power has increasingly made dairying uneconomic for smaller producers. In the 1980s there were 28 dairy farms in the area, but by 2012 there were only three.

Attractions 
Peases Lookout is a tourist attraction on Dalyrmple Road.

References 

Mackay Region
Localities in Queensland